Godzimierz may refer to the following places:
Godzimierz, Kuyavian-Pomeranian Voivodeship (north-central Poland)
Godzimierz, Masovian Voivodeship (east-central Poland)
Godzimierz, West Pomeranian Voivodeship (north-west Poland)